Velutha Kathreena is a 1968 Indian Malayalam film, directed by J. Sasikumar and produced by P. Balthasar, based on the famous novel of the same name, written by Muttathu Varkey. The film stars Prem Nazir, Sathyan, Sheela and Jayabharathi in the lead roles. The film had musical score by G. Devarajan.

Plot
Kathreena is an odd-woman out in her untouchable caste (Pulaya) and the film depicts the atrocities she had to endure due to her skin colour.

Cast

Prem Nazir as Thirumeni
Sathyan as Chellappan
Sheela as Kathreena
Jayabharathi as Rosa
Kaviyoor Ponnamma as Marthappulayi
Adoor Bhasi as Kurayachan
Jose Prakash as Manoharan
Manavalan Joseph as Krishnappanikkar
T. R. Omana as Dr.Sainabha
T. S. Muthaiah as Thevan
Kumari Padmini
 Khadeeja
Aravindan as Madhavan
Bahadoor as Appayi
Mala Shantha as Lakshmikkutti
Meena as Meriyamma
Panjabi as Maniyappan
Shailasree as Narthaki
Parvathy
Leela

Soundtrack
The music was composed by G. Devarajan and the lyrics were written by Sreekumaran Thampi. The violin trio of L. Subramaniam, L. Shankar, and L. Vaidyanathan have played this instrument in the song "Kattuchembakam Poothulayumbol" and famous sitarist Pandit Janardhan Mitta's sitar is heard in "Prabhaatham Vidarum" as well.

Trivia
A television serial named Velutha Katrina was telecast by Kairali channel in 2006, where Sheela returned to play the title character of Katrina. The serial was not a spin-off of the movie. It just utilized name of Sheela's memorable character in the movie.

References

External links
 

1968 films
1960s Malayalam-language films
Films directed by J. Sasikumar